The Class 340 of Renfe (4000 under the previous numbering scheme) were a class of 4-axle  diesel-hydraulic locomotives built by Krauss-Maffei (and Babcock & Wilcox) for the Spanish Railways. The design is similar in outward appearance and technology to the DB Class V 200. 32 units were built.

Background and History
Hydraulic transmissions used were two Mekydro K184.

The contract consisted of a series of 32 units which were shipped between 1966 and 1969, ten manufactured in Germany by Krauss-Maffei and the remaining twenty-two manufactured Spain by Babcock & Wilcox. The locomotives were similar to the V 200.1 Series of the Deutsche Bundesbahn, but with more power, more weight and slightly longer.

None are currently in service and 30 of the 32 units have been scrapped, the 4020 (Renfe 340 020) is in the Museo del Ferrocarril de Madrid and the 4026 (Renfe 340 026) is in the process of being restored by the AZAFT (Asociación Zaragozana de Amigos del Ferrocarril y Tranvías).

References

Further reading
RENFE 340 LA TRACCION DIESEL, Author(s): Josep Miquel & Eduard Ramirez

External links

Museo del Ferrocarril de Madrid Spanish national rail museum website
Photographs of the Class 340 fototrenes.tranvia.org
Images of Class 340 from railfaneurope.net
List of class 340 locomotives www.listadotren.es

340
B-B locomotives
Diesel locomotives of Spain
5 ft 6 in gauge locomotives
Railway locomotives introduced in 1966
Passenger locomotives
Streamlined diesel locomotives